The South African National Biodiversity Institute (SANBI) is an organisation established in 2004 in terms of the National Environmental Management: Biodiversity Act, No 10 of 2004, under the South African Department of Environmental Affairs (later named Department of Environment, Forestry and Fisheries), tasked with research and dissemination of information on biodiversity, and legally mandated to contribute to the management of the country’s biodiversity resources.

History
SANBI was established on 1 September 2004 in terms of the National Environmental Management: Biodiversity Act, No 10 of 2004. Previously, in 1989, the autonomous statutory National Botanical Institute (NBI) had been formed from the National Botanic Gardens and the Botanical Research Institute, which had been founded in the early 20th century to study and conserve the South African flora. The mandate of the National Botanical Institute was expanded by the act to include the full diversity of the South African ecosystems. The NBI had its head office at Kirstenbosch in Cape Town, and gardens and research centres throughout South Africa.

Function and services
Functions include providing knowledge, information, policy support and advice, managing botanical gardens for research, education and public enjoyment, and engaging in ecosystem restoration and rehabilitation programmes and providing models of best practice for biodiversity management.

Core activities include research into conservation and sustainable use, garden development and horticulture, education and provision of biodiversity information systems, ecosystems rehabilitation and development of bioregional planning programmes and policies.

SANBI contributes to the reduction of poverty by providing training and creating sustainable employment in programmes for rehabilitating ecosystems, and programmes to encourage participation in biodiversity science at school level and to strengthen the quality of biodiversity teaching and learning.

Research
Research is a primary component of SANBI’s agenda, and includes research into climate change and bio-adaptation. The research is intended to inform climate change policy development and decision making.

Management of biodiversity resources
SANBI is legally mandated to contribute to the management of the country’s biodiversity resources. The Institute hosts the Red List of South African Plants, a database with descriptions of the country's indigenous plants and their national conservation status.

Knowledge and information management
SANBI conducts nationwide biodiversity conservation assessments of various classes of animals, which generally involve field trips for the collection of data. Interested members of the public can participate in several citizen science projects.

A biodiversity knowledge and information management system is provided which integrates existing information resources for easy access for both internal and external end-users.

See also
 List of botanical gardens in South Africa

References

External links

 
 

Biodiversity
Environmental science
Organisations based in South Africa